A waterhole is a depression in the ground in which water can collect, or a more permanent pool in the bed of an ephemeral river.

Waterhole or water hole may refer to:
 Water hole (radio), an especially quiet region of the electromagnetic spectrum
 Waterhole, Alberta, Canada
 The Water Hole, a 1928 Western film 
 Waterhole No. 3, a 1967 Western comedy film, a comic remake of The Good, the Bad, and the Ugly

See also
 
 Water vole (disambiguation)
 Water well, an excavated hole that is dug to provide water
 Watergate (architecture), a fortified gate to allow water into a fortification
 Watering hole (disambiguation)